Sparganothis daphnana is a species of moth of the family Tortricidae. It is found in Canada, including Newfoundland and Nova Scotia.

References

Moths described in 1961
Sparganothis